Georgian Bay Islands National Park  (established 1929) consists of 63 small islands or parts of islands in Georgian Bay, near Port Severn, Ontario. Prior to the creation of Fathom Five National Marine Park, Flowerpot Island was also a part of the park.

The islands blend the exposed rocks and pines of the Canadian Shield with the hardwood forests found further south. The park can only be reached by boat and all of the islands are open to the public. Limited camping and docking facilities, trails and cabins are only available on the largest island, Beausoleil Island.

It is part of the Georgian Bay Littoral Biosphere Reserve.

Wildlife
It is home to mammalian species such as woodland caribou, white-tailed deer, moose, black bear, coyote, timber wolf, lynx, bobcat, porcupine, raccoon, beaver, red and gray fox species, chipmunk, and red squirrel. This park also provides habitat for 33 species of reptiles and amphibians, including the hognose snake, the eastern fox snake, and the threatened eastern Massasauga rattlesnake. Some of the more isolated islands provide nesting areas for colonies of gulls and terns.

Beausoleil Island

Beausoleil Island is the largest island in the park and it offers island tent camping, overnight and day docking, heritage education programs, and hiking trails. Wheelchair accessible sites and reserved campsites are also available at the Cedar Spring campground on Beausoleil Island.

See also
National Parks of Canada
List of National Parks of Canada

References

External links

National parks in Ontario
Parks in Simcoe County
Protected areas established in 1929
Parks in the District Municipality of Muskoka
Georgian Bay
1929 establishments in Ontario